Tolga may refer to:

People
 Tolga (given name), a given name of Turkish-origin
 Nazlı Tolga, a Turkish-Dutch journalist and television host

Places
 Tolga, Algeria, a municipality in Biskra Province, Algeria
 Tolga District, a district of Biskra Province, Algeria
 Tolga, Norway, a municipality in Innlandet county, Norway
 Tolga (village), a village in Tolga municipality in Innlandet county, Norway
 Tolga Church, a church in Tolga municipality in Innlandet county, Norway
 Tolga, Queensland, a rural town and locality in the Tablelands Region, Queensland, Australia
 Tolga Mountains, the old Turkish name for the Altai Mountains

Other
HMAS Tolga, an auxiliary minesweeper which served in the Royal Australian Navy during World War II